Milan Paroški (Serbian Cyrillic: Милан Парошки; born 5 March 1957) is a Serbian writer and politician.

Biography
He held a speech at the 9 March 1991 protest in Belgrade. Paroški advocated that the FR Yugoslavia recognize the Republic of Serbian Krajina and was leader of the Serbian Chetnik Movement in 1993.

He ran for president of Serbia as candidate of the People's Party and the Serbian Opposition in the 1992 Serbian general election where he received 147,693 votes. He ran for president once again (also as candidate of the People's Party) in the 1997 Serbian general election where he received 27,100 votes.

In 2017 Paroški was a founder of the Christian nationalist party Healthy Serbia.

Published books
RH negativno, 1990
Hronika za ujedinjeno srpsko kraljevstvo, 1993
O državi i narodu, 2000
Andavil, 2001
Raci, 2003
Ra i novi svetski poredak, 2003
Usekovanije, 2006
Sveti Sava i Solomonova mudrost, 2009
Skupštinska proročanstva, 2012
Sorabi su prezali irvase, 2015

References

1957 births
Living people
People from Srbobran
Serbian writers
Serbian monarchists
Members of the National Assembly (Serbia)
Candidates for President of Serbia
University of Belgrade Faculty of Political Science alumni
People's Party (Serbia) politicians
Christian nationalists
Political party founders